National Highway 17 (NH 17) is a National Highway in India running from Sevoke in West Bengal to Guwahati in Assam.

Route
It starts from its junction with NH-10 at 
 Sevoke, Darjeeling district  and connects 
 Mongpong, Kalimpong district, 
 Bagrakote, Chalsa, Nagarkata, Goyerkata, Jalpaiguri district, 
 Birpara, Falakata, Sonarpur Alipurduar district 
 Coochbehar, Tufanganj Cooch Behar district in West Bengal; and further
 Agomani, Golakganj, Bilasipara, Dhubri district,
 North Salmara, Bongaigaon district,
 Goalpara, Goalpara district,
 Bijoynagar, Boko, Kamrup Metropolitan district. and terminating at its junction with NH-27 near Guwahati in Assam

Junctions  

  Terminal at Sevoke.
  Terminal near Bagrakote.
  Terminal near Chalsa.
  Terminal near Binnaguri.
   near Guwahati.

See also
List of National Highways in India by highway number
National Highways Development Project

References

External links 
NH 17 on OpenStreetMap

National highways in India
Transport in Guwahati